Robert F. Riedy (born August 26, 1945) was an American professional basketball player in the National Basketball Association.

Riedy played high school basketball at Dieruff High School in Allentown, Pennsylvania and then collegiately at Duke University.

Riedy was selected by the Baltimore Bullets in the sixth round of the 1967 NBA draft (56th overall pick) but played professionally for the other team that drafted him that year, the Houston Mavericks of the American Basketball Association prior to the ABA–NBA merger.

References

External links 
Bob Riedy page at Basketball-Reference.com

1945 births
Living people
American men's basketball players
Baltimore Bullets (1963–1973) draft picks
Centers (basketball)
Duke Blue Devils men's basketball players
Houston Mavericks draft picks
Houston Mavericks players
Louis E. Dieruff High School alumni
Sportspeople from Allentown, Pennsylvania